Mordellistena brevicornis is a beetle in the genus Mordellistena of the family Mordellidae. It was described in 1895 by Schilsky.

References

brevicornis
Beetles described in 1895